The European Rail Traffic Management System (ERTMS) is an initiative backed by the European Union to enhance cross-border interoperability and the procurement of signalling equipment by creating a single Europe-wide standard for train control and command systems.

Its main components are the European Train Control System (ETCS) and the GSM-R communications system. ETCS is a standard for track-train radio communications using balises (Eurobalises) and associated in-cab train control, while GSM-R is the GSM mobile communications standard for railway operations. ERTMS can operate at different levels depending on specific local requirements. Under ERTMS speeds are displayed in the driver's cab in km/h and at Level 2, lineside speed indicators are optional.

History
In 2007 the British Government published its response to a European Union directive requiring the use of ERTMS on High Speed (TEN-R) and Conventional Trans-European Railway Network (TEN) routes. The response proposed a roll-out plan of ERTMS equipment on existing lines that would be completed by 2044, though the actual timing of the programme will depend on changing circumstances. New trains would be ordered with ERTMS equipment on board and ERTMS would be installed during any electrification programs.
In 2009, the Rail Safety & Standards Board confirmed that km/h would be used on ERTMS lines in the United Kingdom.
With the ongoing introduction of ERTMS, it is foreseen that the metrication of British rail transport will be completed over the next few decades.

The Uff/Cullen inquiry in 2001, following the Southall and Ladbroke Grove rail crashes, identified a need for in-cab signalling on high-speed trains, and recommended that ERTMS should be installed onto all of Britain's high-speed lines by the year 2010. However, this timescale was not viable because of the time required to develop the technology.

Current implementation
The Cambrian Line, a low volume  rail link between Shrewsbury in the east and Aberystwyth and Pwllheli in the west, was chosen as Britain's first ERTMS line. This line was chosen as its signalling system had reached the end of its useful life, and because it is a low capacity line almost separate from the national network, making it an ideal site on which to gain ERTMS experience. All speeds in the Cambrian Line Rule book are in km/h. ERTMS will be rolled out as part of the 21st-century modernisation of the Great Western Main Line, which was expected to reach Oxford and Newbury by 2016 and Cardiff by 2017. As of January 2020, electrification had reached Cardiff.

In February 2016, Network Rail announced that it was considering a trial of ERTMS on the Wherry Lines from Norwich to Lowestoft and Great Yarmouth in East Anglia. The new signalling was introduced in February 2020 however the equipment, while compatible with ETCS in the future, was of a traditional design.

Future use
The specification for High Speed 2 from London to Manchester, Leeds and beyond assumes a minimum of Level 2 ERTMS control and signalling from day one of operations. The Crossrail project in London will also implement ERTMS technology.

After the Wherry Lines trial, a nation-wide rollout of ERTMS was planned. This upgrade would be carried out in stages, with each of the twelve Rail Operating Centres being upgraded at different times.

Metric and Imperial units 
A standard feature of the speedometers used by ERTMS/ETCS systems is the use of the metric system.
At a Railway Conference in 2002, it was argued that a changeover to using metric units for speed in advance of the introduction of ERTMS was unlikely to be financially viable unless the decision is taken to adopt Level 2 ERTMS without lineside signalling. There would however still be a need to handle both mph and km/h in driver cabs.
A 2010 voluntary standards document published by the Rail Safety & Standards Board addressed this issue when it recommended that the speedometer of a ETCS system be designed so that it switches automatically between mph and km/h depending on the route being traversed.  The speedometer would display "mph" when the speedometer was displaying "miles per hour", otherwise would display nothing. Its graduations would be chosen such that the angle of the needle would not change when the system switched from one scale to the other. The conversion between metric and imperial units would be a function of the speedometer, not of any other on-board equipment. In 2012 a technical specification matching this proposal was published.

See also
 Rail transport in Great Britain

Notes

References

European Rail Traffic Management System